Berard (or Bérard) is both a surname and a given name. Notable people with the name include:

People with the given name
Berard of Carbio (died 1220), Italian Franciscan friar
Berard of Castagna (died 1252), Italian archbishop
Bérard d'Albret, Lord of Vayres (died 1346), French nobleman
Berard Haile (1874–1961), American Franciscan priest and anthropologist

People with the surname
Al Berard (born 1960), American Cajun musician and composer
André Bérard (born 1940), Canadian businessman
Auguste Bérard (1802–1846), French surgeon
Bryan Berard (born 1977), American  ice hockey player
Christian Bérard (1902–1949), French artist, fashion illustrator and designer
David Berard (born 1970), American ice hockey coach
Guillaume Bérard ( 1574–1588), French diplomat and physician
Joseph Frédéric Bérard (1789–1828), French physician and philosopher 
Julien Bérard (born 1987), French road bicycle racer
Kally Berard (born 1999), American  actress
Leah Berard (born 1978), American rugby referee
Léon Bérard (1876–1960), French politician and lawyer
Marcel Bérard (born 1933), Canadian politician
Patrick Berard (born 1959), French sprint canoeist
Pierre Bérard (born 1991), French rugby player
Roxane Berard (1933–2019), Belgian-American actress
Thomas Bérard (died 1273), French Grand Master of the Knights Templar 
Victor Bérard (1864–1931), French diplomat and politician

Places
Le Ménil-Bérard, French commune
Grand Bérard (Le), mountain top of Parpaillon massif (3048 m), see List of mountains of the Alps above 3000 m
Berard Beach, Saskatchewan, Canadian hamlet

See also

French-language surnames